Jeff Schalk (born February 6, 1974 in Santa Cruz, California) is a retired professional mountain bike racer.  His racing career began in 2006 when he took hiatus from a career in structural engineering, practicing in San Francisco, California.  He moved to Washington, D.C. to pursue racing full-time with the Trek Volkswagen East Coast factory team.  Schalk's major career breakthrough occurred in 2007 when he won the Shenandoah 100, establishing himself as a primary name in the domestic MTB endurance scene.  When the Trek and Volkswagen partnership dissolved at the end of 2008, the Trek Bicycle Corporation continued its support of Jeff by directly signing him to full sponsorship.  After his breakthrough in 2007, he moved to Frederick, Maryland and began to specialize in ultra-endurance racing events, namely 100-mile mountain bike races.  Over the course of his 6 year career, he amassed 17 wins in 100-mile MTB racing, winning the National Ultra Endurance Series for three consecutive years.  Schalk's sponsors for the majority of his career included: Trek Bicycle Corporation, Bontrager, Fox Racing Shox, Shimano, PowerBar, Dumonde Tech Racing Oils, and ESI Grips.  All of his racing victories came aboard Trek's flagship cross country race bike at the time, the Trek Top Fuel.

He retired from racing at the end of the 2011 season, returning to his career in structural engineering.  He lives in Fort Collins, Colorado, and works for JVA Consulting Engineers.

Major Achievements / Results

2011
1st, Mohican MTB 100 (NUE Race), Ohio - course record
1st, Breckenridge 100 (NUE Race), Colorado - course record
1st, Wilderness 101 (NUE Race), Pennsylvania - course record
1st, Pierre's Hole 100 (NUE Race), Wyoming - course record
2nd, Lumberjack 100 (NUE Race), Michigan
2nd, Syllamo's Revenge 125k (NUE Race), Arkansas
3rd, Cohutta 100 (NUE Race), Tennessee

2010
National Ultra Endurance Series Champion
1st, Cohutta 100 (NUE Race), Tennessee
1st, Mohican MTB 100 (NUE Race), Ohio
1st, Lumberjack 100 (NUE Race), Michigan
1st, Wilderness 101 (NUE Race), Pennsylvania
1st, Fool's Gold 100 (NUE Race), Georgia
1st, Stoopid 50, Pennsylvania
2nd, Shenandoah 100 (NUE Race), Virginia
3rd, Breckenridge 100 (NUE Race), Colorado

2009
National Ultra Endurance Series Champion
1st, Cohutta 100 (NUE Race), Tennessee - course record
1st, Lumberjack 100 (NUE Race), Michigan
1st, Wilderness 101 (NUE Race), Pennsylvania
1st, Stoopid 50, Pennsylvania
2nd, Breckenridge 100 (NUE Race), Colorado
3rd, Mohican MTB 100 (NUE Race), Ohio
3rd, Shenandoah 100 (NUE Race), Virginia

2008
National Ultra Endurance Series Champion
1st, Cohutta 100 (NUE Race), Tennessee
1st, Mohican MTB 100 (NUE Race), Ohio
1st, Lumberjack 100 (NUE Race), Michigan
1st, Wilderness 101 (NUE Race), Pennsylvania
2nd, BC Bike Race, British Columbia, Canada (with teammate Chris Eatough)
3rd, Shenandoah 100 (NUE Race), Virginia

2007
1st, Shenandoah 100 (NUE Race), Virginia
1st, BC Bike Race, British Columbia, Canada (with teammate Chris Eatough)

2006
3rd, Shenandoah 100 (NUE Race), Virginia

References

External links
Trek Bicycle Website
JVA Consulting Engineers Website

1974 births
Living people
American male cyclists
Marathon mountain bikers
American mountain bikers